The 2021 MPBL Invitational, officially known as the Chooks-to-Go MPBL Invitational powered by TM for sponsorship reasons, was an invitational tournament that served as a prelude to the 2022 MPBL season. It commenced on December 11, 2021 and ended on December 23, 2021.

The tournament was also the first for the MPBL since it was granted professional status by the Games and Amusements Board. The Invitational was also the first professional sports event in the Philippines to allow live audiences since the onset of the COVID-19 pandemic in the country, with the Mall of Asia Arena in Pasay, the venue for the tournament only allowing 50 percent capacity.

The Basilan Jumbo Plastic were the 2021 Invitational champions, beating the Nueva Ecija Rice Vanguards in overtime, 83-80.

Format
The format for this tournament was as follows:
 All teams were divided into four groups that would play in a single round-robin format. Every team plays against the other teams in the same group once.

 The top two teams in each group would advance to a single elimination-style playoffs.

Prize money
The champion of this tournament will receive PHP2 million. The runner-up will also receive PHP500,000, and the third placer will receive PHP250,000.

Arena 
All games were played in the Mall of Asia Arena in Pasay. The league welcomed spectators for the first time since the pandemic.

Entertainment 
For the first time since the level of restriction for live musical events are relaxed, Filipino pop and R&B band South Border performed their reunion concert at the pre-show of the championship game. While the rock band Mojofly also performed during the halftime festivities.

Team changes

Participation changes 
A total of ten teams didn't return for the Invitational. As of 2023, the Davao Occidental Tigers and Navotas Uni-Pak Sardines haven't participated in future seasons.

The Bataan Risers, Batangas City Atheltics, Pampanga Giant Lanterns, Quezon City Capitals, and Zamboanga Family's Brand Sardines would later return for the 2022 season, while the Cebu Casino Ethyl Alcohol, Parañaque Patriots, and Pasay Voyagers would return in 2023.

The Negros Muscovados would make their first appearance in the league before making its regular season debut in 2023, thus bringing the total to 22 teams.

Name changes 

 The Bacolod Master Sardines changed its name to All-Star Bacolod Ballers
 The Biñan City Luxxe White changed its name to Laguna Heroes Krah Asia
 The Caloocan Supremos changed its team name to Caloocan Excellence
 The Imus Bandera - Luxxe Slim changed its name to Imus Buracai de Laiya
 The Makati Super Crunch changed its name to Makati FSD Blazers
 The Marikina Shoemasters changed its name to Marikina Shoe City
 The Mindoro Tamaraws changed its name to Mindoro EOG Burlington
 The Rizal Golden Coolors changed its name to Emkai-Rizal Xentromall
 The Valenzuela Classic changed its name to Valenzuela MJAS Zenith

Draw
The draw for the group stage took place on November 26, 2021 at the Crowne Plaza in Pasig, at 3:00 p.m. PST (UTC+8), hosted by Mark Zambrano and Christian Luanzon. The 22 teams were drawn into four groups, two groups of six teams (Groups A and D) and two groups of five teams (Groups B and C).

Basilan was the champion of the Pilipinas VisMin Super Cup and was automatically assigned to Group B as team B1. 2019–20 Lakan season runner-up San Juan was designated in Group C as team C1. The remaining 20 teams were determined by drawing of lots.

Group stage

Group A

Not all games are in home–away format. Each team plays every team once. Number of asterisks after each score denotes number of overtimes played.

Group B

Not all games are in home–away format. Each team plays every team once. Number of asterisks after each score denotes number of overtimes played.

Group C

Not all games are in home–away format. Each team plays every team once. Number of asterisks after each score denotes number of overtimes played.

Group D

Not all games are in home–away format. Each team plays every team once. Number of asterisks after each score denotes number of overtimes played.

Playoffs

Quarterfinals

Semifinals

Third place game

Finals

Statistics

Individual statistical leaders

Team statistical leaders

Awards 
The individual league awards was given during the Semifinals of the 2021 MPBL Invitational at the Mall of Asia Arena in Pasay.

Broadcast
The Intercontinental Broadcasting Corporation (IBC) is the broadcast partner for the 2021 MPBL Invitational every night. Games will also be streamed on the MPBL and Chooks-to-Go Pilipinas Facebook pages. TAP Sports will broadcast the games and also available on TAP Go.

References

2021 in Philippine basketball